Bruno Lopes may refer to:

Bruno Lopes, alias Kool Shen, French rapper and producer
Bruno Lopes (football manager) (born 1984), Portuguese football manager
Bruno Lopes (footballer, born 1986), Brazilian football forward
Bruno Lopes (footballer, born 1995), Brazilian football forward